Dror Eydar was appointed  Israeli Ambassador to Italy on September 2, 2019.

Biography
Dror Eydar earned a Ph.D. in Hebrew and Jewish literature from Bar Ilan University. He was a  Israel Hayom columnist and op-ed editor.

Published works
Alterman–Baudelaire; Paris – Tel Aviv: Urbanism and Myth in the Poetry of Nathan Alterman and Charles Baudelaire (2003)
The Last of the Lord's Poets - Myth, Ethos, and Mysticism in the Literary Works of Yosef Zvi Rimon, (2009).

References

Ambassadors of Israel to Italy
Israeli columnists
Israeli newspaper editors
Year of birth missing (living people)
Living people
Bar-Ilan University alumni